Cecil James Nesbitt, Ph.D., F.S.A., M.A.A.A. (1912 – 2001) was a mathematician who was a Ph.D. student of Richard Brauer and wrote many influential papers in the early history of modular representation theory.  He taught actuarial mathematics at the University of Michigan from 1938 to 1980.  Nesbitt was born in Ontario, Canada. He received his mathematical education at the University of Toronto and the Institute for Advanced Study in Princeton.  He served the Society of Actuaries from 1985 to 1987 as Vice-President for Research and Studies. He developed the Schuette–Nesbitt formula with Donald R. Schuette.

Selected publications
with Richard Brauer: 
with Emil Artin and Robert M. Thrall: 
with R. M. Thrall: 
with George H. Andrews: 
with J. J. McCutcheon: 
with Newton L. Bowers and James C. Hickman: 

with Marjorie V. Butcher: Mathematics of Compound Interest. Ulrichs Books. 1971.

See also
 Schuette–Nesbitt formula

References

 Newton L. Bowers, Hans U. Gerber, James C. Hickman, Donald A. Jones, Cecil J. Nesbitt: Actuarial Mathematics. (2nd ed.), 1997, The Society of Actuaries .
 Charles W. Curtis: Pioneers of Representation Theory. 1999, American Mathematical Society 
 Society of Actuaries' obituary accessed 2007-11-23

External links

20th-century American mathematicians
American actuaries
Canadian actuaries
1912 births
2001 deaths
University of Toronto alumni
University of Michigan faculty